The University of Saskatchewan Rutherford Arena is a hockey rink constructed in 1929, with its official opening in January, 1930.  The rink was used by the Saskatchewan Huskies hockey teams until 2018. It holds up to 700 people.

It was announced on October 13, 2016 that a new arena for the Huskies would be constructed on campus, following a donation of $12.25 million by Merlis Belsher.  That arena, Merlis Belsher Place, officially opened in 2018.

Rutherford Arena was demolished in 2022.

See also
University of Saskatchewan Kinesiology
University of Saskatchewan

References

Sports venues completed in 1929
Rutherford Arena
University and college buildings in Canada
Indoor ice hockey venues in Canada
University sports venues in Canada